Dimitrije "Ditko" Aleksić (died August 4, 1916), was a Serbian guerrilla fighter in Old Serbia and Macedonia during the Macedonian Struggle, and commander in the Balkan Wars and World War I.

Life
Dimitrije Aleksić was born in the village of Osiče in the Kosovo Vilayet of the Ottoman Empire (present-day North Macedonia) in the last quarter of the 19th century. With the establishment of the Serbian Chetnik Organization, his village supported and joined the Serbian Organization. In 1905 he was in the čete (squad) of Đorđe Ristić, Spasa Garda and Krsta Trgoviški. He became vojvoda (duke) in 1911, and with that rank he participated in the Balkan Wars and World War I. He died at the Salonican Front on August 4, 1916.

Sources

Narodna enciklopedija Srpsko-hrvatsko-slovenačka, br. 1, 607.

19th-century births
1916 deaths
Year of birth unknown
People from Staro Nagoričane Municipality
People from Kosovo vilayet
Serbian rebels
Serbian military leaders
Serbian military personnel of the Balkan Wars
Serbian military personnel killed in World War I